We May Be Skinny & Wirey is the debut studio album by British indie rock band The Crocketts. Recorded with producer David M. Allen, the album was released by Blue Dog Records in conjunction with V2 Records on 14 September 1998. "Loved Ya Once", "Flower Girl" and "Explain" were released as singles in 1998, none of which charted.

Critical reception
Critical reception to We May Be Skinny & Wirey was generally positive. A review of the album in music magazine NME awarded it a score of seven out of ten, with the writer proclaiming that "The Crocketts avoid earnest old-world spirituality and feckless odes to drink. They prefer to rage hard and curdle folk melodies with Davey [MacManus, singer]'s splendidly Americanised primal howl and an intriguing array of influences that ranges from the Pixies to Violent Femmes".

Track listing
All songs credited to Davey MacManus/The Crocketts, except where noted.

Personnel

Davey MacManus ("Davey Crockett") – vocals, guitar, production on "Blue Dog"
Dan Harris ("Dan Boone") – guitar
Richard Carter ("Rich Wurzel") – bass
Owen Hopkin ("Owen Cash") – drums
David M. Allen – production on all tracks except "Blue Dog"
Graeme Durham – mastering
John Mossige – photography
Keith Morris – photography
Martin Grosvenor – photography
Insect – art direction, design

References

1998 debut albums
The Crocketts albums
Albums produced by David M. Allen
V2 Records albums